The 2018 Mary Hardin–Baylor Crusaders football team was an American football team that represented the University of Mary Hardin–Baylor in the American Southwest Conference (ASC) during the 2018 NCAA Division III football season. In their 22nd year under head coach Pete Fredenburg, the team compiled a 15–0 record (9–0 against conference opponents) and won the ASC championship. The team advanced to the NCAA Division III playoffs and defeated Mount Union, 24–16, in the 2018 Stagg Bowl.

Three Mary Hardin-Baylor players were selected by the Associated Press as first-team players on its Division III All-America team: running back Markeith Miller; linebacker Jalen Martin; and defensive back Jefferson Fritz.

The team played its home games at Crusader Stadium in Belton, Texas.

Schedule

References

Mary Hardin-Baylor
Mary Hardin–Baylor Crusaders football seasons
NCAA Division III Football Champions
Mary Hardin–Baylor Crusaders football